The 1900 Oklahoma Sooners football team represented the University of Oklahoma as an independent during the 1900 college football season. In their sixth year of football, and fourth year under head coach Vernon Louis Parrington, the Sooners compiled a 3–1–1 record, and outscored their opponents by a combined total of 118 to 28. This season was the first in which the team played the Texas Longhorns and began the Red River Showdown.

Schedule

References

Oklahoma
Oklahoma Sooners football seasons
Oklahoma Sooners football